Laz Aziz Ahmed Pasha (Laz: ლაზი აზიზ აჰმედ-ფაშა Lazi Aziz Ahmed-Paşa) (d. March, 1819. Erzurum) was an Ottoman-born Turkish statesman of ethnic Laz origin. He was the Grand Vizier of the Ottoman Empire.

Biography 
In early times, Ahmed Pasha served as a Janissary and soon was elevated as Kapıcıbaşı. Later he became governor of İbrail. During Russo-Turkish War (1806–1812) he was sent to Erzerum to lead the Ottoman army. After the first victories in the battles, Ahmed Pasha was elevated to Grand vizier office. However, with the signing of the Treaty of Bucharest on May 28, 1812, he was accused by Hurshid Pasha for being incompetent and soon was dismissed. On September 5, 1812, he was replaced by Hurshid Pasha. In 1814, Laz Ahmet Pasha became governor of Bursa, then Aleppo and Erzurum. He died in March 1819 in Erzurum.

See also
 List of Ottoman Grand Viziers

Sources 
 Buz, Ayhan (2009) "Osmanlı Sadrazamları", İstanbul: Neden Kitap, 
 Danişmend, İsmail Hâmi (1971), Osmanlı Devlet Erkânı, İstanbul: Türkiye Yayınevi.
 Tektaş, Nazim (2002), Sadrâzamlar Osmanlı'da İkinci Adam Saltanatı, İstanbul: Çatı Yayınevi.

1819 deaths
19th-century Grand Viziers of the Ottoman Empire
Grand Viziers of the Ottoman Empire